Tiddleywink is a hamlet consisting of eight cottages on the B4039 road, near the village of Yatton Keynell, about  northwest of Chippenham, Wiltshire, England. The name is said to derive from rhyming slang for "a quick drink", one of its cottages historically being known to serve beer to passing cattle drovers.

Because of its small size, Tiddleywink has been for many years omitted from the official book of place names, the Collins British Atlas and Gazetteer, and from most maps. It has been shown, however, that it was recognised as a settlement in the 1881 census, when it had a total of 28 residents.

Early in 2003, after much campaigning, residents won their settlement two new road signs and widespread recognition as their story made the national news.

References

External links

 Tiddleywink on the map – BBC News article, February 19, 2003

Hamlets in Wiltshire